United States v. Morris may refer to:
United States v. Morris (1840), 39 U.S. (14 Pet.) 464 (1840), interpreting the Slave Trade Act of 1800
United States v. Morris (1991), 928 F.2d 504 (2d Cir. 1991), the first conviction under the Computer Fraud and Abuse Act